Conus ermineus, common name the turtle cone, is a species of sea snail, a marine gastropod mollusk in the family Conidae, the cone snails and their allies.

Like all species within the genus Conus, these snails are predatory and venomous. They are capable of "stinging" humans, therefore live ones should be handled carefully or not at all.

Distribution
This species occurs in the Caribbean Sea and the Gulf of Mexico to South America; in the Atlantic Ocean off West Africa and the Cape Verdes; in the Indian Ocean off Tanzania.

Description
The maximum recorded shell length is 103 mm.

Conantokin-E is a toxin derived from the venom of Conus ermineus.

It is a fishing eating species. Utilizes specialized hollow harpoon like radula tooth to harpoon small fish and paralyze them with venom to facilitate swallowing.

Habitat
Minimum recorded depth is 0 m. Maximum recorded depth is 101 m.

Venom 
Conus ermineus is a venomous species and capable of stinging humans, so it should be treated with caution. A delta-conotoxin (delta-EVIA) isolated from the venom of C. ermineus inhibits the inactivation of vertebrate Na + neural channels.

References

  Petit, R. E. (2009). George Brettingham Sowerby, I, II & III: their conchological publications and molluscan taxa. Zootaxa. 2189: 1–218
 Puillandre N., Duda T.F., Meyer C., Olivera B.M. & Bouchet P. (2015). One, four or 100 genera? A new classification of the cone snails. Journal of Molluscan Studies. 81: 1–23

Gallery

External links
 The Conus Biodiversity website
 Cone Shells – Knights of the Sea
 

ermineus
Gastropods described in 1778
Molluscs of the Atlantic Ocean
Molluscs of the Indian Ocean
Gastropods of Cape Verde
Invertebrates of Tanzania
Taxa named by Ignaz von Born